Veronica "Nica" Hults (born June 16, 1998) is an American artistic gymnast. She is a former national team member.

Personal life 
Veronica was born in Honolulu, Hawaii and was raised by mother Emer and father Scott Hults. She has two younger siblings, John and Sofia. Nica is in 11th grade at the online school Laurel Springs, graduating in 2016. Following graduation from high school, she will compete for the UCLA gymnastics team. She currently lives in Coppell, Texas.

Junior career

2010 
In 2010, Hults competed as a Level 9 gymnast and trained at All Olympia Gymnastics Center under Artur Akopyan. She was the Level 9 State Floor Champion and the Western National Floor Champion. Later that year, she relocated to Texas with her family and began training at Texas Dreams Gymnastics.

2011 
Hults began her competitive season at the WOGA Classic Elite Qualifier, where she won the balance beam title. Later that year, she traveled to Florida to compete at the Disney Elite Qualifier and managed to qualify to Junior International Elite status, finishing 5th with a total score of 52.100. She competed at the U.S. Classic, placing 13th. This was sufficient to qualify to the USA Gymnastics National Championships, where she competed on the uneven bars and the balance beam.

2012 
Hults placed 8th at the Secret U.S. Classic again qualifying to the National Championships, where she placed 9th with a combined 2-day score of 107.600.

2013 
At the Secret U.S. Classic, Hults won the gold medals on the uneven bars and the balance beam, as well as the bronze medal in the all-around competition. At the National Championships, her sixth-place finish (cumulative score of 111.900) secured her a berth on the U.S. Junior National Team. Hults made her international debut at the 2013 Mexico Open in Acapulco, where she won the gold medal with teammates Bailie Key, Laurie Hernandez, and Emily Gaskins and placed first on the uneven bars.

Senior career

2014 
Hults' senior debut came in 2014.

Veronica competed on uneven bars only at the 2014 Secret U.S. Classic, placing 6th on that event and 15th overall.

Following her competition at the 2014 P&G Championships, Hults didn't make the U.S. National Team but was invited to the 2014 Worlds selection camp. She was not selected for the team.

2015–16: Elite hiatus and transfer to Level 10
Hults didn't compete during the 2015 season, at all; the result of injuries. In January 2016, she competed Level 10 at her gym's local invitational.

References

External links
 The Official Website

Living people
1998 births
American female artistic gymnasts
Sportspeople from Honolulu
American sportspeople of Filipino descent
U.S. women's national team gymnasts
21st-century American women